R.B. (Brian) Outhwaite (1935–2005) was a social, legal and economic historian. For the last 31 years of his life, he was a member of Gonville and Caius College, Cambridge, where he was, latterly, Director of Studies.

Publications

 Clandestine Marriage in England, 1500–1850
 Inflation in Tudor and Early Stuart England
 Dearth, Public Policy and Social Disturbance in England 1550–1800
 Scandal in the Church: Dr Edward Drax Free, 1764–1843
 The Rise and Fall of the English Ecclesiastical Courts, 1500–1860

External links 
  Obituary, Economic History Society (UK), August 2002 newsletter
 The Rise and Fall of the English Ecclesiastical Courts, 1500–1860

1935 births
2005 deaths
Fellows of Gonville and Caius College, Cambridge
20th-century English historians
21st-century English historians